The Akola–Ratlam rail line is a railway line in India linking Akola in Maharashtra with Ratlam in Madhya Pradesh. As of January 2023, Ratlam to Dr.Ambedkar Nagar, Sanawad to Khandwa And Akot to Akola Has been Completed.

History 
The Akola–Ratlam metre-gauge line was opened in 1963. Dhulghat Spiral is a unique spiral located on this metre-gauge section at around 2 kilometres from Dhulghat station towards Akola. It is also called 'Char Cha Akda' in Marathi and 'Char Ka Aankda' in Hindi, which in English means 'the figure 4' – railway tracks are arranged like 4 

In 2008, the Union Cabinet approved the gauge conversion for the Ratlam–Mhow–Khandwa–Akola railway line of 472.64 km. The gauge conversion is in process. 

The Mathela–Nimarkhedi–NTPC Khargone section was converted to broad gauge and started on 12 August 2019 and electrification was also done on 15 March 2020. 

Thereafter, the Akola Junction–Akot section line gauge conversion project of this mainline was completed on 28 July 2020.

Loco Shed 

Mhow Diesel Loco Shed and Ratlam Diesel Loco Shed are loco sheds on this line. These were earlier metre-gauge sheds but are now converted to broad-gauge sheds.

Trains

 Ajmer–Hyderabad Meenakshi Express
 Mhow–Indore Passenger
 Indore–Dr. Ambedkar Nagar DEMU
 Ratlam–Laxmibai Nagar DEMU
 Indore–Ratlam DEMU
 Jodhpur–Indore Express
 Dr. Ambedkar Nagar–Sanawad Passenger
 Rewa–Dr. Ambedkar Nagar Express

References

Rail transport in Madhya Pradesh
Transport in Indore
Transport in Ujjain
Transport in Ratlam
Transport in Akola
Rail transport in Maharashtra